The women's shot put at the 1946 European Athletics Championships was held in Oslo, Norway, at Bislett Stadium on 22 August 1946.

Medalists

Results

Final
22 August

Participation
According to an unofficial count, 15 athletes from 11 countries participated in the event.

 (2)
 (1)
 (1)
 (1)
 (1)
 (2)
 (3)
 (1)
 (1)
 (1)
 (1)

References

Shot put
Shot put at the European Athletics Championships
Euro